Rahim Fortune (born 1994) is an American fine-art / documentary photographer, living and working between Austin, Texas and Brooklyn, New York. He has made two books of work in the Southern United States: Oklahoma (2020) and I Can't Stand to See You Cry (2021).

Life and work
Fortune was born in Austin, Texas and grew up in nearby Kyle, and in Chickasaw Nation, Oklahoma. His mother is Chickasaw and his father is African American. Fortune is a self-taught photographer.

Oklahoma (2020) is a two-volume self-published book made "on trips back to Tupelo, Oklahoma, where he and his sister lived with their mother earlier in their childhood."

I Can't Stand to See You Cry (2021) "touches on the declining health and death of a parent, the COVID-19 pandemic, and the protests and uprising in response to the police murders of Black people around" the United States. Made in Texas and surrounding states, mostly in 2020, the book includes intimate black and white portraits of strangers and his family members, urban landscapes, textures, and abandoned buildings. It was made using a medium format film camera.

Fortune has also photographed Black and Indigenous people living in waterfront communities in America; the Bronner Bros. Hair Show in Atlanta (a twice-yearly show where contestants demonstrate the styling of Black hair"); and has made street style portraits in New York City using an iPhone. He has undertaken commissions for The New York Times.

, he lived in Brooklyn, New York.

Publications
Oklahoma. Self-published, 2020. .
I Can't Stand to See You Cry. London: Loose Joints, 2021. .

Group exhibitions
From the Limitations of Now, Philbrook Museum of Art, Tulsa, Oklahoma, 2021

References

External links

"Rahim Fortune's Highly Personal Portrait of the American South" – interview in AnOther
"Rahim Fortune captures loss, anger and healing in Texas" – interview in i-D
"Rahim Fortune and Mahmoud 'Mo' Mfinanga discuss Fortune's latest photobook, I can't stand to see you cry" – interview in the British Journal of Photography
"Wordless Touch" – Alec Soth discusses I Can't Stand to See You Cry (video)

Documentary photographers
Fine art photographers
Photographers from Texas
21st-century American photographers
People of African-American descent
American people of Chickasaw descent
Living people
1994 births